Atractocarpus merikin, commonly known as the mountain gardenia or merikin, is a plant in the Rubiaceae family endemic to northeast Queensland.

Description
They are narrow at the base and broadest near the far end of the blade, and the base is auriclulate and sessile or almost sessile.

The inflorescences may consist of panicles, fascicles or solitary flowers, and are produced in the leaf axils. The white fragrant flowers have 5 petals and measure about  diameter.

Phenology
Flowering occurs from October to February, fruits ripen from July to February.

Taxonomy
This species was first described in 1902 by the English born Australian botanist Frederick Manson Bailey in his book The Queensland Flora, in which he gave it the name Gardenia merikin. In 1999 the Australian botanist Christopher Francis Puttock transferred the taxon to the genus Atractocarpus, which is the current combination.

Etymology
The genus name Atractocarpus is created from the Ancient Greek atractos (spindle) and karpos (fruit). It refers to the shape of the fruit of the type species, Atractocarpus bracteatus. The species epithet merikin is the local indigenous name for the plant.

Distribution and habitat

Conservation
This species is listed by the Queensland Department of Environment and Science as least concern. , it has not been assessed by the IUCN.

Gallery

References

External links
 
 
 View a map of historical sightings of this species at the Australasian Virtual Herbarium
 View observations of this species on iNaturalist
 View images of this species on Flickriver

merikin
Endemic flora of Queensland
Taxa named by Christopher Francis Puttock
Plants described in 1999